Societe Internationale Pour Participations Industrielles Et Commerciales, S.A. v. Rogers, 357 U.S. 197 (1958), was a case decided by the United States Supreme Court, in which the court considered whether a district court could dismiss a case based on the petitioner's failure to comply with the court's order to produce records of the petitioner's Swiss bank account, an act which would have amounted to a violation of Swiss law.

External links
 
 

United States Supreme Court cases
United States Supreme Court cases of the Warren Court
1958 in United States case law